The term Noonday Demon (also Noonday Devil, Demon of Noontide, Midday Demon or Meridian Demon) is used as a personification and synonym for acedia, which stems from the Greek word "akēdeia" which means to lack care.  It indicates a demonic figure thought to be active at the noon hour which inclines its victims (usually monastics) to restlessness, excitability and inattention to one's duties. 

It comes from biblical sources: Psalm 91:6 of the Hebrew Bible reads "mi-ketev yashud tsohorayim": from destruction that despoils at midday. This phrase was translated into Alexandrian Greek in the Septuagint into. "apo pragmatos diaporeuomenou en skotei apo symptwmatos kai daimoniou mesembrinou" ([you need not fear] the pestilence that walks in darkness, nor the destruction that wastes at noonday.). In the Vulgate, Jerome's translation of the Septuagint into Latin, we can find a personification in the daemonium meridianum ("Non timebis . . . ab incursu et daemonio meridiano"). This demonic personification is kept in the Catholic Douay-Rheims translation of the Old Testament of 1609 (Psalms 90:6). An exception is King James Version of 1611, where the translation follows the Hebrew: "the destruction that wasteth at noonday". The Orthodox Study Bible confirms the understanding of Saint Jerome and translates Psalm 91:6 as "Nor by a thing moving in darkness, Nor by mishap and a demon of noonday." Holman reported that an Aramaic paraphrasing text in the Dead Sea Scrolls of this Psalm from the first century speaks of demons and spiritual warfare as the Latin and Greek translations did.

In the writings of Evagrius Ponticus, a Christian monk and ascetic, the Noonday Demon is specifically responsible for acedia, which he describes as "daemon qui etiam meridianus vocatur", attacking the cenobites most frequently between the hours of ten and two. It caused a sentiment characterized by exhaustion, listlessness, sadness, or dejection, restlessness, aversion to the cell and ascetic life, and yearning for family and former life.

In De Occulta Philosophia, Heinrich Cornelius Agrippa calls the Meridian Devill Meririm, "the power of the air, the spirit that now worketh in the children of disobedience".

Ways of Countering the Demon

Tears 
There are several documented ways of combating this demon. One of which being tears. Tears were seen in Eastern tradition as a "acknowledgment of ones need of Savior." This tactic is seen as an exact opposite of "lack of care" and would counteract the demon.

Ora et labora 
Ora et labora is the balance of prayer and work in life and is said to be strictly practiced if meant to be used as a counter to the Noonday Demon.

"Talking back" to the Devil 
This method is also known as the "antirrhetic method" and is the use of scripture or prayers to combat negative or evil thoughts that arise in oneself. It is seen as one of the most prominent ways to combat the demon, as Jesus himself used this method in the Judaean desert.

Memento mori 
This method is seen as a way to ground oneself to their mortality, by meditating on death rather than life, it is used to recognize one's mortality in order to use life to decide where one's place in the afterlife would be, thus making the choice to act.

Perseverance 
The last and most simple method to countering the demon is to simply staying on the path of duty, not allowing oneself to stay off the path. Maintaining focus and activity in order to keep the demon away, also known as the "Essential Remedy".

See also
Aboulia
Acedia
Anomie
Sloth (deadly sin)
Weltschmerz
Lady Midday

References

 Solomon, Andrew The Noonday Demon.
 Grayston, Donald Thomas Merton and the Noonday Demon: The Camaldoli Correspondence.
 Kuhn, Reinhard Clifford The Demon of Noontide: Ennui in Western Literature.
 Scott-Macnab, David The Many Faces of the Noonday Demon // Journal of Early Christian History. — 2018. — Vol. 8, no. 1. — P. 22-42.
 Nelson, Matthew "Acedia: Beating Back the "Noonday Devil" Word on Fire.

Christian mythology
Demons in Christianity